Charles H. Brandes is an American investor, businessman, and philanthropist. He is a disciple of the Benjamin Graham school of value investing. Brandes Investment Partners, which was started in 1974, currently has over $28.9 billion under management (down from over $111 billion in 2007) and is based in San Diego, California. In the Forbes 400 Richest Americans publication for 2007, Brandes ranked 165.

According to Forbes, Brandes was worth over US$1.billion as of January 2018.

Early life and education
Brandes grew up in Pittsburgh. In 1965, he graduated from Bucknell University with a bachelor's degree in economics. He did graduate studies at San Diego State University.

Brandes is a CFA charterholder. Brandes met Ben Graham in San Diego while he was training to be a stockbroker. He was able to learn firsthand the techniques Graham used to determine undervalued investment securities.

Career
As of 2007, Brandes' U.S. Value Equity fund has beaten the S&P 500 index for the past 5, 10 and 15 years. According to the book Investment Leadership, Brandes' Global equity fund had an average return of 19.21% over the prior 20 years. Brandes Investments strictly follows Graham and Dodd principles as outlined in the books Security Analysis and The Intelligent Investor. Also recently, the firm made investments in the troubled mortgage and financial sectors, paying bargain prices for investments in Countrywide Financial, Washington Mutual, Wachovia Corp. and Bank of America. Brandes is among the largest institutional shareholder of Royal Bank of Scotland and General Motors. Thomson Financial's well-regarded Nelson's World's Best Money Managers rankings consistently lists Brandes Investment Partners among the Top 10 International Equity Fund Managers in the world.

Brandes' adherence to Graham and Dodd principles has extended to investment research. He commissioned a study to investigate the "Falling Knives" strategy, the investment axiom that catching falling knives (a stock whose price has been dropping precipitously) is like catching falling money (likely to lead to losses). Researching 1,000 companies between 1986 and 2002 whose price had fallen 60% over a twelve-month period, the study found that within three years of the decline 13% of the companies went bankrupt, but despite this that the portfolio as a whole gained in value by 18% over three years. Announced departure from the firm effect February 26, 2018. Brandes published a well-received book on his investment strategies in 2003 titled Value Investing Today (McGraw-Hill).

Philanthropy
The Tanya and Charles Brandes Foundation funded a scholarship program at San Diego Jewish Academy's Maimonides Upper School.

Personal life
Brandes has been married four times:
In 1986, he married his second wife Linda King Formo (born 1948). They divorced in 2004. They did not have children.
in 2006, he married Tanya Johnson; in 2018 the couple announced that they were divorcing citing mutual domestic violence as one of the causes. He lives in San Diego County in Rancho Santa Fe on 30 Acres.
in 2020 he was married in a private ceremony over Zoom, the couple celebrated Sept 9 2021 in a public ceremony with friends and family.

See also
Value Investing
Benjamin Graham
David Dodd
William J. Ruane
Irving Kahn

References

External links
Brandes Investment Partners web site
Charles Brandes Videoconference
The Tanya & Charles Brandes Foundation
Nelson's World's Best Money Managers rankings

1943 births
Living people
American billionaires
American financial analysts
American investors
American investment advisors
American financial company founders
American financiers
American money managers
American philanthropists
American stockbrokers
Bucknell University alumni
Businesspeople from San Diego
CFA charterholders
Businesspeople from Pittsburgh
San Diego State University alumni